P. V. N. Madhav is a Bharatiya Janata Party politician from Andhra Pradesh. He has been elected in Andhra Pradesh Legislative Council election in 2017 from Graduates constituency as candidate of Bharatiya Janata Party.

References 

Bharatiya Janata Party politicians from Andhra Pradesh
Members of the Andhra Pradesh Legislative Council
Year of birth missing (living people)
People from Visakhapatnam
Living people